The Del-Aires were a Paterson, New Jersey rock band of the 1960s. They were featured as themselves in Del Tenney's 1964 B-movie beach party film,  The Horror of Party Beach. For the film, Gary Robert Jones and Ronnie Linares wrote one song together, "Drag," and one song each: "Wigglin' Wobblin'" (Jones) and "Elaine" (Linares). The Del-Aires performed all six songs in the film, which included "Joy Ride", "The Zombie Stomp" and "You Are Not a Summer Love." Following his stint with the Del-Aires, saxophonist/guitarist/keyboardist Bobby Osborne was a member of the band Gas Mask, perhaps best known for having their first (and only) album, Their First Album, produced by Teo Macero.

References

Musical groups from New Jersey